Foolad Mobarakeh Sepahan is an Iranian UCI Continental cycling team established in 2015.

Team roster

References

External links

UCI Continental Teams (Asia)
Cycling teams established in 2015
Cycling teams based in Iran
2015 establishments in Iran